Sankar Chatterjee (born May 28, 1943) is a paleontologist, and is the Paul W. Horn Professor of Geosciences at Texas Tech University and Curator of Paleontology at the Museum of Texas Tech University. He earned his Ph. D. from the University of Calcutta in 1970 and was a Post-doctoral Fellow at the Smithsonian Institution from 1977-1978.

Chatterjee has focused on the origin, evolution, functional anatomy, and systematics of Mesozoic vertebrates, including basal archosaurs, dinosaurs, pterosaurs, and birds. He has researched Late Triassic reptiles in India, such as phytosaurs, rhynchosaurs, and prolacertiformes. He is best known for his work on vertebrates recovered in the 1980s from the Post Quarry in the Late Triassic Cooper Canyon Formation (Dockum Group) of West Texas. The material includes the large rauisuchian Postosuchus, which was named for the nearby town of Post. It also included controversial specimens Chatterjee identified as being avian (Protoavis). The identification of these specimens as avian would push back the origin of birds by at least 75 million years.

In 2008, Chatterjee and Rick Lind designed a 30-inch unmanned aerial vehicle with a large, thin rudder inspired by the crest of Tupandactylus, to be called a Pterodrone.
The large, thin rudder-like sail on its head functioned as a sensory organ that acted similarly to a flight computer in a modern-day aircraft and also helped with the animal's turning agility. “These animals take the best parts of bats and birds,” Chatterjee said. “They had the maneuverability of a bat, but could glide like an albatross. Nothing alive today compares to the performance and agility of these animals. They lived for 160 million years, so they were not stupid animals. The skies were darkened by flocks of them. They were the dominant flying animals of their time.” “[W]e’ve found they could actually sail on the wind for very long periods as they flew over the oceans.... By raising their wings like sails on a boat, they could use the slightest breeze in the same way a catamaran moves across water. They could take off quickly and fly long distances with little effort.”

Genera named 
The following genera were named by Chatterjee :

Selected publications

Books

References

20th-century births
Year of birth missing (living people)
Living people
American paleontologists
Texas Tech University faculty
University of Calcutta alumni
Scientists from West Bengal